TEX35 is a protein that in humans is encoded by the TEX35 gene.

References

External links

Further reading

Uncharacterized proteins